Patrick O’Keeffe (born 1963 in Limerick) is an Irish American novelist and short story writer.

Life
He grew up in County Limerick, on  a farm with his 9 brothers and sisters, but moved to the United States in his 20s to pursue writing.
He graduated from the University of Kentucky, and from the University of Michigan with an MFA.
He taught at the University of Michigan, University of Cincinnati,
and Colgate University. He currently teaches in the graduate creative writing program at Ohio University.

Awards
 2006 Whiting Award
 2005 Story Prize

Works

References

External links
Patrick O'keeffe, personal web site
Profile at The Whiting Foundation
""The Hill Road", Mostly Fiction Mary Whipple FEB 19, 2007
"Patrick O'Keeffe", Arts at Michigan, Zoe Rudisill, Winter 2006
"Story Prize winner Patrick O'Keeffe", Vanderbilt University, December 9, 2009 
"Colgate's Living Writers: Patrick O'Keeffe 11/12/09" YouTube

American short story writers
1964 births
Writers from Limerick (city)
Living people
Irish emigrants to the United States
University of Michigan alumni